Novyye Karmaly (Yañı Qaramalı) is a rural locality (a selo) and the administrative centre of Novokarmalinsky Selsoviet, Miyakinsky District, Bashkortostan, Russia. The population was 576 as of 2010. There are 3 streets.

Geography 
Novyye Karmaly is located 10 km northwest of Kirgiz-Miyaki (the district's administrative centre) by road. Sukkul-Mikhaylovka is the nearest rural locality.

References 

Rural localities in Miyakinsky District